During the 1967–68 season, Red Star Belgrade participated in the 1967–68 Yugoslav First League, 1967–68 Yugoslav Cup and 1967–68 Mitropa Cup.

Season summary
Red Star won their third double in this season. On 23 November 1967, promising Red Star player Dejan Bekić died after long battle with cancer in the lymph nodes.

Squad

Results

Yugoslav First League

Yugoslav Cup

Mitropa Cup

See also
 List of Red Star Belgrade seasons

References

Red Star Belgrade seasons
Red Star
Red Star
Yugoslav football championship-winning seasons